Tazeh Kand-e Mohammadiyeh (also Romanized as Tāzeh Kand-e Moḩammadīyeh) is a village in Gharbi Rural District, in the Central District of Ardabil County, Ardabil Province, Iran. At the 2006 census, its population was 136, in 28 families.

References 

Towns and villages in Ardabil County